Dhiraj Singh (born 21 November 1987) is an Indian cricketer who plays for Odisha. He was the leading wicket-taker for Odisha in the 2018–19 Vijay Hazare Trophy, with ten dismissals in six matches.

References

External links
 

1987 births
Living people
Indian cricketers
Odisha cricketers
People from Cuttack
Cricketers from Odisha